The Ehrenfest theorem, named after Paul Ehrenfest, an Austrian theoretical physicist at Leiden University, relates the time derivative of the expectation values of the position and momentum operators x and p to the expectation value of the force  on a massive particle moving in a scalar potential ,
The Ehrenfest theorem is a special case of a more general relation between the expectation of any quantum mechanical operator and the expectation of the  commutator of that operator with the Hamiltonian of the system 

It is most apparent in the Heisenberg picture of quantum mechanics, where it  amounts to just the expectation value of the Heisenberg equation of motion.  It provides mathematical support to the correspondence principle.

The reason is that Ehrenfest's theorem is closely related to Liouville's theorem of Hamiltonian mechanics, which involves the Poisson bracket instead of a commutator. This makes the operator expectation values obey corresponding classical equations of motion, provided the Hamiltonian is at most quadratic in the coordinates and momenta. Otherwise, the evolution equations still may hold approximately, provided fluctuations are small.

Relation to classical physics 
Although, at first glance, it might appear that the Ehrenfest theorem is saying that the quantum mechanical expectation values obey Newton’s classical equations of motion, this is not actually the case. If the pair  were to satisfy Newton's second law, the right-hand side of the second equation would have to be

which is typically not the same as

If for example, the potential  is cubic, (i.e. proportional to ), then  is quadratic (proportional to ).

In that special case,  and  do agree. Thus, for the case of a quantum harmonic oscillator, the expected position and expected momentum do exactly follow the classical trajectories.

In that case, the expected position and expected momentum will approximately follow the classical trajectories, at least for as long as the wave function remains localized in position.

Derivation in the Schrödinger picture 
Suppose some system is presently in a quantum state .

where we are integrating over all of space. If we apply the Schrödinger equation, we find that

By taking the complex conjugate we find 

Note , because the Hamiltonian is Hermitian.  Placing this into the above equation we have

Often (but not always) the operator  is time-independent so that its derivative is zero and we can ignore the last term.

Derivation in the Heisenberg picture 
In the Heisenberg picture, the derivation is straightforward. The Heisenberg picture moves the time dependence of the system to operators instead of state vectors. Starting with the Heisenberg equation of motion,

One may pull the  out of the first term, since the state vectors are no longer time dependent in the Heisenberg Picture. Therefore,

General example 
The expectation values of the theorem, however, are the very same in the Schrödinger picture as well. For the very general example of a massive particle moving in a potential, the Hamiltonian is simply

where  is the position of the particle.

Suppose we wanted to know the instantaneous change in the expectation of the momentum . Using Ehrenfest's theorem, we have

since the operator  commutes with itself and has no time dependence.

After applying the product rule on the second term, we have

Nevertheless, as explained in the introduction, for states that are highly localized in space, the expected position and momentum will approximately follow classical trajectories, which may be understood as an instance of the correspondence principle.

Similarly, we can obtain the instantaneous change in the position expectation value.

This result is actually in exact accord with the classical equation.

Derivation of the Schrödinger equation from the Ehrenfest theorems 
It was established above that the Ehrenfest theorems are consequences of the Schrödinger equation. However, the converse is also true: the Schrödinger equation can be inferred from the Ehrenfest theorems. We begin from

Application of the product rule leads to

Here, apply Stone's theorem, using  to denote the quantum generator of time translation.  The next step is to show that this is the same as the Hamiltonian operator used in quantum mechanics.  Stone's theorem implies

where  was introduced as a normalization constant to the balance dimensionality.

Assuming that observables of the coordinate and momentum obey the canonical commutation relation  . Setting , the commutator equations can be converted into the differential equations

whose solution is the familiar quantum Hamiltonian

Whence, the Schrödinger equation was derived from the Ehrenfest theorems by assuming the canonical commutation relation between the coordinate and momentum. If one assumes that the coordinate and momentum commute, the same computational method leads to the Koopman–von Neumann classical mechanics, which is the Hilbert space formulation of classical mechanics. Therefore, this derivation as well as the derivation of the Koopman–von Neumann mechanics, shows that the essential difference between quantum and classical mechanics reduces to the value of the commutator .

The implications of the Ehrenfest theorem for systems with classically chaotic dynamics are discussed at Scholarpedia article Ehrenfest time and chaos. Due to exponential instability of classical trajectories the Ehrenfest time, on which there is a complete correspondence between quantum and classical evolution, is shown to be logarithmically short being proportional to a logarithm of typical quantum number. For the case of integrable dynamics this time scale is much larger being proportional to a certain power of quantum number.

Notes

References

Theorems in quantum mechanics
 Mathematical physics